The Taipei Aerospace & Defense Technology Exhibition (TADTE) is a biennial defense exhibition held in Taiwan.

TADTE is organized by the Taiwan External Trade Development Council (TAITRA). It is held biennially. Repeat exhibitors include both local firms such as, Lungteh Shipbuilding, foreign companies such as Lockheed Martin, and military concerns such as National Chung-Shan Institute of Science and Technology and the Republic of China Army arsenals (primarily the 202, 205 and 209). It is generally a three day event.

History 
From 2013-2015 the Exhibition experienced a 27% increase in the number of exhibitors.

The 2019 Exhibition featured an enclosed UAV Test Flight area for product demonstrations. The US Government approved export licenses to allow advanced American technology to be exhibited during the 2019 show.

See also 
 Africa Aerospace and Defence Expo
 Eurosatory
 Egypt Defence Expo
 International Defence Exhibition
 International Defence Industry Exhibition
 International Defence Exhibition and Seminar
 Defense industry of Taiwan

External links

References 

Trade fairs in Taiwan
Arms fairs